Ivers Whitney Adams (May 20, 1838 – October 10, 1914) was an American baseball executive and businessperson, and founder of the first professional baseball team in Boston, the Boston Red Stockings.

Baseball 

Adams was the founder, organizer and first president of the Boston Base Ball Association, the legal corporation that operated the baseball club initially known as the Boston Red Stockings. The club was Boston's first professional baseball team, continues to operate today as the Atlanta Braves, and is the longest continuously operating team in Major League Baseball. On January 20, 1871, the Boston Base Ball Association was legally organized by Adams with $15,000 raised from investors and the commitment of Harry Wright, manager of America's first professional baseball team, the Cincinnati Red Stockings, to manage the new Boston club.

Business career 

Adams was a native of Ashburnham, Massachusetts, but left the town at the age of 19 to seek his fortune in Boston. He became the president of the American Net and Twine Company, which was the largest manufacturer of its kind in the world at that time. Throughout his life Adams kept an interest in the activities of his home community. Adams was an enthusiastic sportsman, he had a fishing lodge in Canada, from which he sent his Ashburnham friends fresh salmon, and a hunting preserve in Virginia. He was interested in the propagation of fish, and for some years leased from the town of Ashburnham, Upper Naukeag Lake, where he maintained a summer home on an island.

One of Ashburnham's problems which concerned Adams was the town's inadequate water system. Adams presented Ashburnham with a new water system, which included a pumping station at Upper Naukeag Lake, a storage tank at Bulkeleys Corner and six and a half miles of new water mains. The town's new water system was dedicated on Columbus Day in 1912. Adams was the guest of honor.

Bela Pratt's sculpture, Ashburnham's Schoolboy of 1850, was presented to the town of Ashburnham and Schools by Adams in 1913, a year before his death. The statue is a life size bronze figure on a granite base and depicts a 12-year-old schoolboy walking to his one-room district school in 1850. The boy is barefoot, wears a straw hat and is carrying a writing slate and lunch pail. Adams gave the statue to the town to honor and encourage young country boys, like he at one point was, to value education so they could take their love of nature, community spirit and creative thinking, learned in the Ashburnham pioneering woods out into the world.

The Schoolboy Statue of 1850 stands now at the corner of School and Main Street, near the entrance of Cushing Academy.

Death and Burial

He died on October 10, 1914, and was buried behind Cushing Academy in New Ashburnham Community Cemetery.

References

External links
 SABR biography
 

1838 births
1914 deaths
Baseball executives
People from Ashburnham, Massachusetts
Boston Braves (baseball)